Dobromir, known to the Byzantines as Chrysos, was a leader of the Vlachs and Bulgarian Slavs in eastern Macedonia during the reign of the Byzantine emperor Alexios III Angelos. According to Niketas Choniates, Dobromir Chrysos was, despite his Slavic name, a Vlach (an Aromanian or Megleno-Romanian) by birth. However, most probably he was of mixed Slavic–Vlach origins. Due to the complexity of pre-nationalist ethnic labels, references to modern ethnic groups in the Middle ages are obscure. He became prominent in 1197 and is last heard of in 1202. 

He was already married, but in order to cement an alliance with him the Emperor offered him a daughter of the Byzantine warlord Manuel Kamytzes.  She was forced to divorce her husband and to marry Dobromir in 1198. About 1200 he took a third wife, the Emperor's granddaughter Theodora Angelina, who had previously been married to a rival leader, Ivanko.

In 1202 the lands of Dobromir Chrysos were conquered by Bulgarian emperor Kaloyan.

Sources
O city of Byzantium: annals of Niketas Choniates tr. Harry J. Magoulias (Detroit: Wayne State University Press, 1984) pp. 267–270, 277-280, 293-294.

Notes

Literature 
 Томов, Т. Добромир Хриз, който владееше Просек и Струмица - Анамнеза, Т. 6 (2008), 97-114

12th-century Bulgarian people
13th-century Bulgarian people
Bulgarian people of the Byzantine–Bulgarian Wars
Medieval Bulgarian military personnel
12th-century births
13th-century deaths
Medieval Bulgarian nobility
History of the Aromanians
History of the Megleno-Romanians
Rulers in medieval Macedonia